Christine Blundell (born October 1961) is a British make-up artist who won an Academy Award in the category of Best Makeup during the 72nd Academy Awards. She won for the film Topsy-Turvy. Her win was shared with Trefor Proud.

She has over 50 credits since her start in 1990 as well as a make-up academy based in Camden, the Christine Blundell Make-Up Academy (CBMA).

References

External links

1961 births
Living people
Best Makeup Academy Award winners
Best Makeup BAFTA Award winners
British make-up artists
Film people from London